Hibbertia acuminata is a species of flowering plant in the family Dilleniaceae and is endemic to eastern Australia. It is an erect shrub with lance-shaped to egg-shaped, stem-clasping leaves and yellow flowers arranged singly in leaf axils with about forty stamens surrounding the carpels.

Description
Flowering occurs from July to November.

Taxonomy
Hibbertia acuminata was first formally described in 1990 by Barry Conn in the journal Muelleria from specimens collected by William Blakely and David Shiress near Copmanhurst in 1922. The specific epithet (acuminata) means "pointed", referring to the sepals.

Distribution and habitat
This hibbertia grows scattered locations in coastal heath and forest ranges on sandstone. It is found between Coffs Harbour and south-eastern Queensland, mostly commonly on the Richmond Range.

See also
List of Hibbertia species

References

acuminata
Flora of Queensland
Flora of New South Wales
Plants described in 1990
Taxa named by Barry John Conn